Kunyi may be,

Kunyi language
Liu Kunyi
Zhang Kunyi